Javier Mecerreyes Campal (born 4 July 2000) is a Spanish professional footballer who plays as a midfielder for Sporting de Gijón B.

Club career
Born in Avilés, Asturias, Mecerreyes joined Sporting de Gijón's Mareo in 2013, from CD Quirinal. On 21 June 2019, he signed a three-year contract with the club, being promoted to the reserve team in Segunda División B.

Mecerreyes made his senior debut on 22 September 2021, starting in a 0–0 away draw against Racing de Ferrol. He scored his first goal on 15 December, netting the B's second in a 6–0 home routing of SCR Peña Deportiva.

Mecerreyes made his first team debut on 29 May 2022, coming on as a second-half substitute for fellow youth graduate Gaspar Campos in a 0–1 Segunda División home loss against UD Las Palmas.

References

External links

2000 births
Living people
People from Avilés
Spanish footballers
Footballers from Asturias
Association football midfielders
Segunda División players
Segunda División B players
Tercera Federación players
Sporting de Gijón B players
Sporting de Gijón players